Sharratt may refer to any of the following:

People with surname Sharratt
Bryan Sharratt (1947–2007), US attorney
Harry Sharratt (1929–2009), British athlete in football
Henry Sharratt,  English  rugby league footballer who played in the 1950s and 1960s
John Sharratt (1850–1892), English cricketer
Mary Sharratt, American novelist
Nicholas Sharratt, English operatic tenor
Nick Sharratt (born 1962), British artist
Paul Sharratt (1933–2009), British television personality
Martin Sharratt (born 1964), British revolutionary thinker

Other
George Sharratt Pearson (1880–1966), English-born wholesale grocer, political figure in British Columbia
Pringle Richards Sharratt (formed 1996), British architectural firm

See also
Charrat
Sarratt
Sarrot
Surratt